Tachaa   (also Tshea) is a  town in Akkar Governorate, Lebanon.

The population of Tshea is  Sunni Muslim and Maronite.

History
In 1838, Eli Smith noted  the village as Tasha', located east of esh-Sheikh Mohammed. The residents were Sunni Muslims and  Greek Orthodox.

References

Bibliography

External links
Tachaa, Localiban 

Populated places in Akkar District
Sunni Muslim communities in Lebanon
Maronite Christian communities in Lebanon